Lorenzo Cybo Malaspina (20 July 1500 – 14 March 1549) was an Italian general, who was duke of Ferentillo.

Family

Born at Sampierdarena (in what is modern Genoa), he was the son of Franceschetto Cybo and Maddalena de' Medici, daughter of  Lorenzo de' Medici. His uncle was Pope Leo X. His paternal grandfather was Pope Innocent VIII. The former pushed him to marry Ricciarda Malaspina, heir of the Malaspina family, by which he founded the Cybo-Malaspina family. This family later included the marquisses and princes of Massa-Carrara.

His sons Giulio and Alberico held in succession the lordship of Massa and Carrara after Lorenzo's death, under the tutorage of their mother Ricciarda.

Military service

A skilled soldier, he held the position of commander-in-chief of the Papal Army.

See also
Portrait of Lorenzo Cybo

1500 births
1549 deaths
15th-century Genoese people
16th-century Genoese people
16th-century Italian military personnel
Military personnel from Genoa
Lorenzo
Dukes of Italy
Papal States military personnel
Generals of former Italian states
People from Sampierdarena